Penybont Football Club is a Welsh football club that plays in the Cymru Premier. The current club was formed in 2013, following the merger of Bridgend Town and Bryntirion Athletic. Penybont play their home games at Bryntirion Park (known as The SDM Glass Stadium for sponsorship reasons).

History
To coincide with the merger of the two clubs, artificial turf was laid at Bryntirion Park and at the Bridgend College Football Academy in Pencoed, funded by the sale of Bridgend Town's former Coychurch Road ground to superstore chain ASDA.

The club began the season with a series of away games since Bryntirion Park's 3G pitch installation was incomplete until January 2014. The club's first league game was away against Ton Pentre, the result of which was a 1–0 loss.

The new pitch was officially opened by former Cardiff City manager Malky Mackay on 7 January 2014 at a friendly game played against a Cardiff City Development XI. Cardiff's development team won the match 5–0.

The club's first manager was Francis Ford, who managed Bryntirion Athletic prior to the club's merger with Bridgend Town. Penybont ended their inaugural season in third place in the Welsh Football League Division One.

On 18 January 2015, the club announced that it had reached a sponsorship agreement with Bridgend-based KYMCO Healthcare UK, which included renaming Bryntirion Park as The KYMCO Stadium.

The club finished the 2014–15 season in 5th place in Welsh League Division One.

On 12 September 2015, the club announced that it had applied for a Football Association of Wales Domestic License for the Cymru Premier. This indicated that the club was committed to improving the facilities at Bryntirion Park in order to make the club applicable for promotion to the top flight.

In May 2016, Francis Ford resigned from his post as manager to be replaced by former Plymouth Argyle, Newport County and Cymru Premier footballer Rhys Griffiths. On 11 June, former Cardiff City and Newport County player Martyn Giles was appointed as his assistant.

On 13 April 2019, it was confirmed that the club had secured promotion to the Cymru Premier after promotion rivals Cambrian & Clydach Vale and Cwmamman United suffered defeats.

On 4 July 2019, former Dundee F.C. and Partick Thistle player Daniel Jefferies signed for the club.

On 23 December 2021, the club announced the signing of former Swansea City, AFC Bournemouth and  Wales international Shaun MacDonald on an 18-month deal.

Current squad

Club honours

League
Southern Football League
Winners: 1979–80 (as Bridgend Town)

Welsh Football League Division One
Winners: 1968–69, 1972–1973 (as Bridgend Town); 2010–2011 (as Bryntirion Athletic); 2018–19 (as Penybont)
Runners-up: 1975–76 (as Everwarm); 1976–77, 1984–85, 1985–86 (as Bridgend Town)

Welsh Football League Division Two
Winners: 1996–97 (as Bridgend Town)

Welsh Football League Division Three
Winners: 2003–04 (as Bryntirion Athletic)

Cups
Welsh Cup
Runners-up: 2021–22
Semi finalists: 1976–77, 2008–09 (as Bridgend Town)

Welsh Football League Cup
Winners: 1987–88 (as Bridgend Town)
Runners-up: 1998–99 (as Bridgend Town); 2007–08, 2012–13 (as Bryntirion Athletic)

References

External links
Facebook page
Instagram account
Twitter account

2013 establishments in Wales
Football clubs in Wales
Cymru Premier clubs
Welsh Football League clubs
Association football clubs established in 2013
Bridgend
Football clubs in Bridgend County Borough
Penybont F.C.
Sport in Bridgend County Borough